Naomi Lynn Gerber is an American internist and physician-scientist who researches chronic illness, human movement, and the treatment of fatigue. She is a professor at George Mason University in the department of health administration and policy and director of research in the department of medicine at Fairfax Hospital Inova Health System.

Life 
Gerber completed a M.D. at the Tufts University School of Medicine. From 1975 to 2005, she was chief of the rehabilitation medicine department at the National Institutes of Health Clinical Center. She researches the "causes of functional loss and disability in chronic illness. Specifically, she studies human movement and the mechanisms and treatment of fatigue."

In 2008, Gerber was elected as a member of the National Academy of Medicine. As of 2018, Gerber is a professor at George Mason University in the department of health administration and policy and director of research in the department of medicine at Fairfax Hospital Inova Health System. She is also chair of the rheumatology section at the Inova Health System and primary investigator at the Center for the Study of Chronic Illness and Disability at George Mason University. In 2018, she received the Frank H. Krusen, M.D., Lifetime Achievement Award of the American Academy of Physical Medicine and Rehabilitation.

References 

Living people
Year of birth missing (living people)
Place of birth missing (living people)
American internists
Tufts University School of Medicine alumni
National Institutes of Health people
George Mason University faculty
21st-century American women physicians
21st-century American physicians
Physician-scientists
American medical researchers
Women medical researchers
Members of the National Academy of Medicine
Women internists